Crissey Field State Recreation Site is a state park in the U.S. state of Oregon, administered by the Oregon Parks and Recreation Department. It is the south-westernmost point in the state of Oregon.

The northern boundary of the park is the Winchuck River.  The southern border is indeterminate, varying by source.  However it clearly ends a few hundred feet into California, north of Pelican Beach State Park.

The park is named after the abandoned airfield contained within it, Crissey Airport.  The runway is now a beach access footpath.

See also
 List of Oregon state parks

References

External links
 

State parks of Oregon
Parks in Curry County, Oregon